Robert Paul Schweikher (1903–1997) was a mid-century modern architect from Denver, Colorado.

Biography

Paul Schweikher was born in Denver, Colorado in 1903 to a family of musicians. He originally trained at the University of Colorado for a year (1921–22) before marrying his wife. He moved with her to Chicago, Illinois and studied at The Art Institute of Chicago while working for the firm of Lowe & Bollenbacher. Schweikher worked his way up from a clerk to a construction supervisor. After two-and-a-half years at the firm, Schweikher left to join the David Adler practice. Among the projects that Schweikher worked on was the William McCormick Blair Estate in Lake Bluff, Illinois.

He later studied at the Armour Institute of Technology before again transferring to, and receiving a degree from, the Yale School of Architecture. He returned to Chicago after his schooling in 1930 and collaborated with George Fred Keck and Philip Maher. He quickly rose to prominence, and his works were included in an exhibition at the Museum of Modern Art in 1933. His work was also exhibited at the Century of Progress International Exposition. Schweikher joined the practice of Lamb and Elting in 1934.

In 1953, Schweikher was named chairman of the Yale School of Architecture, following the retirement of George Howe. Five years later, he resigned from the university to take a position as head of the Carnegie School of Architecture. He retired in 1970 and moved to Sedona, Arizona, where he opened a small practice. Schweikher died in 1997.

Buildings and projects

 1932: Eliason House, Chicago, Illinois. (unbuilt)
 Model exhibited at the Museum of Modern Art in 1933.
 1936: Third Unitarian Church, Chicago, Illinois.
 Listed as a Chicago landmark.
 1937–38: Paul Schweikher House and Studio, Roselle (now Schaumburg), Illinois.
 Listed on the National Register of Historic Places.
 1939–42: Redwood Village Cooperative (a.k.a. North Shore Cooperative), Glenview, Illinois.
 1940: Lewis House, Park Ridge, Illinois.
 1940: S.W. Burda House, Mount Prospect, Illinois.
 1947: Donald Berg House, Glen Ellyn, Illinois.
 1948: Upton House, Scottsdale, Arizona. (later destroyed)
 1950: Finch House, Paradise Valley, Arizona.
 1950: R. Harring, Jr. House, Highland Park, Illinois.
 1954: Alfred A. Schiller House, Glen Ellyn, Illinois.
 Listed on the National Register of Historic Places.
 1955: Josiah Willard Gibbs Research Laboratories, Yale University.
 1956: Allen Hall, University at Buffalo, Buffalo, New York.
 1962–66: Student Union at Duquesne University, Pittsburgh, Pennsylvania.
 1965: Carnegie Library, Knoxville Branch, Pittsburgh, Pennsylvania.
 1967: Craig Wright House, Fox Chapel, Pennsylvania.
 1970: WQED Building, Pittsburgh, Pennsylvania.
 1972: Schweikher House, Sedona, Arizona

References

 Paul Schweikher biography by the Art Institute of Chicago
 Paul Schweikher oral history (1984)
 Chicago Bauhaus and Beyond: Paul Schweikher, Architect
 Paul Schweikher Collection at Arizona State University
 The S.W. Burda House Designed by Paul Schweikher
 

1903 births
1997 deaths
Architects from Colorado
Architects from Denver
Illinois Institute of Technology alumni
Yale University alumni
20th-century American architects
People from Sedona, Arizona